The 1983 North Carolina Tar Heels football team represented the University of North Carolina at Chapel Hill during the 1983 NCAA Division I-A football season. The Tar Heels were led by sixth-year head coach Dick Crum and played their home games at Kenan Memorial Stadium in Chapel Hill, North Carolina. They competed as members of the Atlantic Coast Conference, finishing in second.

Schedule

A. Clemson was under NCAA probation and was ineligible for the ACC title. As a result, this game did not count in the league standings.

References

North Carolina
North Carolina Tar Heels football seasons
North Carolina Tar Heels football